Lithoxus bovallii is a species of armored catfish endemic to Guyana where it occurs in stony rivulets in the Ireng River basin.  This species grows to a length of  SL.

References 
 

Ancistrini
Endemic fauna of Guyana
Fish of Guyana
Fish described in 1906